A POW bracelet (or POW/MIA bracelet) is a nickel-plated or copper commemorative bracelet engraved with the rank, name, and loss date of an American serviceman captured or missing during the Vietnam War.

The bracelets were first created in May 1970 by a California student group called Voices in Vital America (VIVA), with the intention that American prisoners of war in Vietnam not be forgotten. Those who wore the bracelets vowed to leave them on until the soldier named on the bracelet, or their remains, were returned to America.

The bracelets, which cost 30 cents to produce, sold for $2.50 or $3.00 and increased VIVA's income to more than $7 million by 1973. Between 1970 and 1973, approximately 4 million bracelets were distributed. Politicians, entertainers, and models wore the bracelets.

See also
POW/MIA flag
Yellow ribbon

References

Further reading
Hawley, Thomas M. The Remains of War: Bodies, Politics, and the Search for American Soldiers Unaccounted for in Southeast Asia. Durham: Duke University Press, 2005. Page 51. 
Hesse, Rayner W. Jewelrymaking Through History: An Encyclopedia. Westport, Conn: Greenwood Press, 2007. Page 30.
Holsinger, M. P. (1999). War and American popular culture: A historical encyclopedia. Westport, Conn: Greenwood Press. Page 409–410.
Wiest, A. A., Barbier, M., & Robins, G. (2010). America and the Vietnam War: Re-examining the culture and history of a generation. New York: Routledge. Page 181
"History of the POW/MIA Bracelet" by Carol Bates Brown: The Vietnam Veterans Memorial
Appy, Christian G. Patriots: The Vietnam War Remembered from All Sides. Viking. 2003. Pages 489–492.

External link

Vietnam War POW/MIA issues
Vietnam War
Bracelets
1970s
POW/MIA advocacy